The Blue is a market place in Bermondsey, London.

The Blue may also refer to:
The Blue (musical duo), a South Korean musical duo
The Blue (album), an album by Novembre
The Blue (April EP), a 2018 EP by April
"The Blue", a song by Acid Bath from When the Kite String Pops
"The Blue" (Against All Will song)
"The Blue" (David Gilmour song)
Albertsons Stadium, Boise, Idaho, U.S., nicknamed "The Blue" due to its blue artificial turf surface

See also

TheBlu, digital media franchise founded in 2011
Blue (disambiguation)
The Blue Album (disambiguation)
The Blue EP (disambiguation)